The men's 4 × 400 metres relay was the longer of the two men's relays on the Athletics at the 1972 Summer Olympics program in Munich.  It was held on 9 September and 10 September 1972.

The United States were heavily favoured in this event.
Unfortunately, after the 400 metres final, the IOC banned gold and silver medalists Vince Matthews and Wayne Collett from the remainder of the Olympics after they staged a protest on the podium, talking to each other and failing to stand at attention during the medal ceremony, while the third American in the event, John Smith, had pulled a hamstring as he was leading 80 metres into the final and had been ruled unfit to run.

This left the Americans unable to field a team, and they were forced to scratch, leaving no clear favourite.

Results
Top two in each heat (blue) and the next two fastest (green) advanced to the finals.

Heats

Heat one

Heat two

Heat three

Final

References

External links
Official report

Men's 4 × 400 metres relay
Relay foot races at the Olympics
Men's events at the 1972 Summer Olympics